This article lists political parties in Vietnam.

Vietnam is a Marxist–Leninist one-party state based on democratic centralism. This means that only one political party, the Communist Party of Vietnam is legally allowed to hold effective power. Vietnamese elections conform to the popular front principle used in communist countries. The united front in Vietnam is called the Vietnamese Fatherland Front and is led by the Communist Party of Vietnam.

Other parties
Only the Communist Party of Vietnam is legal to operate in Vietnam, other parties exist outside Vietnam or secretly operate inside Vietnam:
Bloc 8406 (prohibited in Vietnam)
Committee for a Workers International (prohibited in Vietnam)
Nationalist Party of Greater Vietnam (DVQDĐ) (outside Vietnam)
People's Action Party of Vietnam (PAP) (outside Vietnam)
Vietnamese Nationalist Party (VNQDĐ) (outside Vietnam)
Vietnam Reform Revolutionary Party (Việt Tân) (outside Vietnam, prohibited in Vietnam)
Vietnam Populist Party (ĐVD) (outside Vietnam, prohibited in Vietnam)

Many members of these parties have been jailed in Vietnam under the charge of "attempt to overthrow the government". Political rights are very limited in Vietnam, especially the right to change the form of government.

Defunct parties
Cochinese Democratic Party
Constitutional Party
Democratic Party of Vietnam (disbanded in 1988)
Forces for National Reconciliation
International Communist League (Vietnam)
National Social Democratic Front (disbanded in 1975)
Personalist Labor Revolutionary Party (disbanded in 1963)
Socialist Party of Vietnam (disbanded in 1988)

See also
Politics of Vietnam
List of political parties by country

References

Vietnam
Vietnam
 
Political parties
Political parties